Mount Elliott Company Metallurgical Plant and Mill is a heritage-listed smelting works via Sheaffe Street, Cloncurry, Shire of Cloncurry, Queensland, Australia. It was built from 1926 to April 1927. It was added to the Queensland Heritage Register on 17 June 2003.

History 
During 1924-25 the Mount Elliott Company and Hampden Cloncurry negotiated a scheme of amalgamation but this fell through when Mount Elliott acquired the Mount Cuthbert properties. In 1926 Hampden Cloncurry conceded defeat and offered its assets for sale by tender, most being acquired by Mount Elliott, who finally gained control of virtually the entire Cloncurry copper field and belatedly fulfilled William Henry Corbould's vision of 1909 for amalgamation. But it was too late: funds were exhausted and prices were low. The company decided to use the Henry Squarebrigs Mackay's new process to utilise the low-grade ores of the district. This was a new form of electrolytic smelting.

This comprised crushing, roasting furnace, leaching vats and a cell house section and was completed in April 1927. It was the first plant of its kind ever built and Mackay supervised its construction at Cloncurry.

The } diameter Mackay modified wedge furnace had seven roasting and one drying hearths. The furnace was connected to a Wilson pressure-type gas producer, which delivered gas to the roasting furnace as fuel to roast the ore. On the ground level were three wooden solution circulating tanks.

The plant included a Babcock and Wilcox boiler with a } steel chimney stack. A Belliss and Morcom compound engine was directly connected to a 400 kW alternator.

However, before the plant was actually commissioned, instructions were received from London to close down without even a trial run. Apparently, the  construction expenses had been too high and it was considered that the capacity was insufficient for profitability.

It has been asserted that the company had infringed a foreign patent, but cost factors may have influenced the decision to close the plant.

Description 

The place contains the remains of an electrolytic reduction plant comprising five groups of structures.

The primary crusher and ore dump group situated to the south comprise an ore dump site, earth loading ramp, concrete surfaces, tanks and building foundations. An iron flotation unit is located on the site (not in situ).

To the north are the concrete mounts and foundations of a wedge roasting furnace. These structures include a flue and iron chimney base and a vertical boiler alongside a concrete tank.

The walls of the vat are supported by heavy concrete buttresses.

The northern group of structures is located alongside to south of the Cloncurry - Mount Isa railway.

The fifth component of the site is the foundations of a former laboratory building, constructed with mud brick walls with cement render on exterior and interior surfaces.

Plant equipment at the site includes a vertical boiler (no brand) and flotation unit (not in situ) (no brand).

Heritage listing 
Mount Elliott Company Metallurgical Plant and Mill was listed on the Queensland Heritage Register on 17 June 2003 having satisfied the following criteria.

The place is important in demonstrating the evolution or pattern of Queensland's history.

Its construction testifies to the optimism held by the company for a centralised modern plant to service all their scattered ore reserves across the region.

The place demonstrates rare, uncommon or endangered aspects of Queensland's cultural heritage.

The Mount Elliott Company Metallurgical Plant is significant in Queensland's history as the only recorded surviving evidence of an early electrolytic plant. The laboratory remnants associated with the plant are architecturally uncommon, being made of ant bed adobe bricks.

The place is important in demonstrating a high degree of creative or technical achievement at a particular period.

The process was Henry Squarebrigs Mackay's own invention and the plant was designed in London. It was the first plant of its kind ever built and Mackay supervised its construction at Cloncurry.

References

Attribution

External links 

Queensland Heritage Register
Cloncurry, Queensland
Heritage-listed industrial buildings in Queensland
Articles incorporating text from the Queensland Heritage Register
Metallurgical industry of Australia